Łukaszów may refer to the following places in Poland:
Łukaszów, Lower Silesian Voivodeship (south-west Poland)
Łukaszów, Masovian Voivodeship (east-central Poland)